Lääne-Nigula Parish is a rural municipality of Estonia, in Lääne County.

Lääne-Nigula Parish was established by merging Oru, Risti and Taebla parishes after the municipal elections held on 20 October 2013. In 2017, the former municipalities Noarootsi, Nõva, Kullamaa and Martna were also merged into Lääne-Nigula.

Politics
There are 17 seats in the local government council.

Settlements
Small boroughs
Palivere - Taebla - Risti 

Villages
Allikmaa - Allikotsa - Auaste - Aulepa - Dirhami - Ehmja - Einbi - Elbiku - Enivere - Hara - Hindaste - Hosby - Höbringi - Ingküla - Jaakna - Jalukse - Jõesse - Jõgisoo - Kaare - Kaasiku - Kabeli - Kadarpiku - Kalju - Kärbla - Kasari - Kastja - Kedre - Keedika - Keravere - Keskküla - Keskvere - Kesu - Kirimäe - Kirna - Koela - Kokre - Koluvere - Kudani - Kuijõe - Kuke - Kullamaa - Kullametsa - Kuluse - Kurevere - Laiküla - Leediküla - Leila - Lemmikküla - Liivaküla - Liivi - Linnamäe - Luigu - Männiku - Martna - Mõisaküla - Mõrdu - Nigula - Nihka - Niibi - Niinja - Nõmme - Nõmmemaa - Nõva - Ohtla - Oonga - Oru - Osmussaare - Österby - Paslepa - Peraküla - Piirsalu - Putkaste - Pälli - Päri - Pürksi - Rannajõe - Rannaküla - Rehemäe - Riguldi - Rooslepa - Rõude - Rõuma - Saare - Salajõe - Saunja - Seljaküla - Silla - Soolu - Soo-otsa - Spithami - Sutlepa - Suure-Lähtru - Suur-Nõmmküla - Tagavere - Tahu - Tammiku - Telise - Tuka - Tuksi - Turvalepa - Tusari - Ubasalu - Üdruma - Uugla - Uusküla - Vaisi - Vanaküla - Vanaküla (Gambyn) - Variku - Vedra - Võntküla - Väike-Lähtru - Väike-Nõmmküla - Väänla - Vidruka

Religion

Gallery

References

External links
 

 
Municipalities of Estonia
Populated places established in 2013